Jacco Eltingh and Paul Haarhuis were the defending champions, but lost in second round to Jan Apell and Mike Bauer.

Yevgeny Kafelnikov and David Rikl won the title by defeating Wayne Ferreira and Javier Sánchez 6–1, 7–5 in the final.

Seeds

Draw

Finals

Top half

Bottom half

References
 Official results archive (ATP)
 Official results archive (ITF)

Italian Open - Mens Doubles, 1994
1994 Italian Open (tennis)